Liveta Jasiūnaitė (born 26 July 1994) is a Lithuanian athlete who specialises in the javelin throw. She competed in the javelin throw event at the 2016 European Championships in Amsterdam, Netherlands. Jasiūnaite holds the Lithuanian record in javelin throw. In 2011, she won the silver medal at the European Youth Summer Olympic Festival. In 2015, she won the bronze medal at the European Athletics U23 Championships.

International competitions

Personal bests

Outdoor

References

External links 
 

1994 births
Living people
Lithuanian female javelin throwers
European Games competitors for Lithuania
Athletes (track and field) at the 2019 European Games
Universiade gold medalists in athletics (track and field)
Universiade gold medalists for Lithuania
Competitors at the 2017 Summer Universiade
Medalists at the 2019 Summer Universiade
Athletes (track and field) at the 2020 Summer Olympics
Olympic female javelin throwers
Olympic athletes of Lithuania
20th-century Lithuanian women
21st-century Lithuanian women